The Fox Theatre Historic District is located in Midtown Atlanta, Georgia. It is listed on the National Register of Historic Places and consists of the following buildings:
 the Fox Theatre (Oliver Vinour et al., 1929)
 William Lee Stoddart's Georgian Terrace Hotel (1911), site of the 1939 gala ball for the premiere of Gone with the Wind, the film 
 Stoddart's Italianate (or Beaux-Arts/Renaissance-revival) Ponce de Leon Apartments (1913)
 the Cox-Carlton Hotel (Pringle and Smith, 1925), originally built as a bachelor hotel but now a Hotel Indigo.

Photo Gallery of the Fox Theatre Historic District

References

Pringle and Smith buildings
William Lee Stoddart buildings
Historic districts on the National Register of Historic Places in Georgia (U.S. state)
National Register of Historic Places in Atlanta